The United States was the host nation for the 1996 Summer Paralympics in Atlanta, Georgia.  Its athletes finished first in the gold and overall medal count.

Medalists

The following American athletes won medals at the games.

See also 

 1996 Summer Paralympics
 United States at the 1996 Summer Olympics

References

External links
International Paralympic Committee Official Website
United States Paralympic Committee Official Website

Nations at the 1996 Summer Paralympics
1996
Paralympics